is a private university in Komaki, Aichi, Japan, established in 1998 and specializing in the humanities.  It is right next to Nagoya Zokei University and is associated with Aichi Bunkyo Women's College.

External links
 Official website 

Educational institutions established in 1998
Private universities and colleges in Japan
Universities and colleges in Aichi Prefecture
1998 establishments in Japan
Komaki